Cyclarbamate (INN; Casmalon), also known as cyclopentaphene, is a muscle relaxant and tranquilizer of the carbamate family which has been marketed by Cassenne in France since 1961.

References 

Carbamates
GABAA receptor positive allosteric modulators
Cyclopentanes